The 1987 Arab League summit was held on 8 November in Amman as the sixteenth Arab League Summit.

References

1987 Arab League summit
20th century in Amman
Events in Amman
1987 in Jordan
Diplomatic conferences in Jordan
20th-century diplomatic conferences
Arab League
1987 in international relations
November 1987 events in Asia